"Quizás Debió Llover" is a Latin pop song by Colombian recording duo Siam, is their debut single and the first single from their for her self-titled debut album (2010).
The song was released during broadcasting of the final episode of El Factor X, winning that night the first place.

Track listing 
Album version
 "Quizás Debió Llover" -

References 

Siam (duo) songs
2009 singles
Spanish-language songs
EMI Records singles
2009 songs